Rumination is the focused attention on the symptoms of one's distress, and on its possible causes and consequences, as opposed to its solutions, according to the Response Styles Theory proposed by Nolen-Hoeksema (1998).

Because the Response Styles Theory has been empirically supported, this model of rumination is the most widely used conceptualization. Other theories, however, have proposed different definitions for rumination. For example, in the Goal Progress Theory, rumination is conceptualized not as a reaction to a mood state, but as a "response to failure to progress satisfactorily towards a goal". As such, both rumination and worry are associated with anxiety and other negative emotional states; however, its measures have not been unified. Multiple tools exist to measure ruminative thoughts. Treatments specifically addressing ruminative thought patterns are still in the early stages of development.

Theories

Response styles theory
Response styles theory (RST) initially defined rumination as passively and repetitively focusing on one's symptoms of depression and the possible causes and consequences of these symptoms. As evidence for this definition, rumination has been implicated in the development, maintenance, and aggravation of both depressive symptoms as well as episodes of major depression. Recently, RST has expanded the definition of rumination beyond depression to include passive and repetitive focus on the causes, consequences, and symptoms of one's distress in general. This change was made because rumination has been implicated in a host of disorders, not just depression.

RST also contends that positive distraction is the healthy alternative to rumination, where focus is directed to positive stimuli instead of to distress. However, the literature suggests that positive distraction may not be as potent a tool as once thought.

Specifically, the S-REF model defines rumination as "repetitive thoughts generated by attempts to cope with self-discrepancy that are directed primarily toward processing the content of self-referent information and not toward immediate goal-directed action." Put more simply, when a person ruminates, he or she aims to answer questions such as:
 How do I feel about this event?
 How can I change my thoughts and feelings about the event?
 How can I prevent disturbing thoughts and feelings in the future?
However, in answering these questions, ruminators tend to focus on their emotions (i.e., "self-referent information") as opposed to problem solving (i.e., "goal-directed action").

Meta-cognition is also an important part of the S-REF model and helps to explain the link between rumination and depression. Specifically, those who hold "positive meta-cognitive beliefs" about rumination (to make sense of negative thoughts and emotions or ensure the prevention of the same) are perhaps initially motivated to engage in rumination with high perseverance. However, individuals who have engaged themselves in positive acts of rumination were more likely to use rumination as a coping mechanism upon encountering negative emotions. This causes the individual to modify his/her perception of rumination as unpleasant, unmanageable and "socially damaging" in general. Rumination additionally has a tendency to magnify with an up-regulation of emotions in the body, thus beginning the downward-moving spiral of depression. The individual's "negative meta-cognitive" beliefs then contribute to the development and maintenance of depression.

Goal progress theory
Goal progress theory (GPT), sometimes referred to as Control Theory, seeks to explain rumination as a function of goal progress. Specifically, GPT views rumination as an example of the Zeigarnik Effect, which suggests that individuals are more likely to remember information from unfinished tasks than from finished tasks. From this understanding, GPT defines rumination as "the tendency to think recurrently about important, higher order goals that have not yet been attained" or towards which sufficient progress has not been made.

GPT predicts that individuals for whom goal-related information is highly accessible should be more likely to ruminate. Various studies have provided support for this prediction. However, the rumination experienced is focused more towards problem solving than rumination described by RST.

Pathology
Extensive research on the effects of rumination, or the tendency to self-reflect, shows that the negative form of rumination (associated with dysphoria) interferes with people's ability to focus on problem-solving and results in dwelling on negative thoughts about past failures. Evidence from studies suggests that the negative implications of rumination are due to cognitive biases, such as memory and attentional biases, which predispose ruminators to selectively devote attention to negative stimuli.

The organic causes of rumination are not fully understood. Research has identified the activation of certain regions in the brain's default mode networks as neural substrates of rumination, but the number of brain-imaging studies on rumination is limited.

The tendency to negatively ruminate is a stable constant over time and serves as a significant risk factor for clinical depression. Not only are habitual ruminators more likely to become depressed, but experimental studies have demonstrated that people who are induced to ruminate experience greater depressed mood. There is also evidence that rumination is linked to general anxiety, post traumatic stress, binge drinking, eating disorders, and self-injurious behavior. Research suggests that rumination is somewhat associated with a higher frequency of non-suicidal self-injury, and more heavily associated with a history of non-suicidal self injury.

Rumination was originally believed to predict the duration of depressive symptoms. In other words, ruminating about problems was presumed to be a form of memory rehearsal which was believed to actually lengthen the experience of depression. The evidence now suggests that although rumination contributes to depression, it is not necessarily correlated with the duration of symptoms.

Research on the relationships between executive functions and rumination has yielded mixed results. Some studies have observed a negative correlation with two executive functioning abilities, set-shifting and inhibition, but the magnitudes of those relationships are unclear. Another study observed only one relationship between rumination and one executive function, specifically the ability to discard past information from working memory. Other studies, however, found no relationship between rumination and working memory.

Types
Theories of rumination differ in their predictions regarding the content of ruminative thoughts based on their respective conceptualizations.
Some models propose that rumination is focused on negative feeling states and/or the circumstances surrounding that emotion (RST, rumination on sadness, five-factor model, negative cognitive style, social phobia models). Rumination in other models focuses on discrepancies between one's current and desired status (goal progress, conceptual evaluative model of rumination). Finally, other models propose that it is the negative themes of uncontrollability and harm in metacognitions that are most important. Some common thoughts that are characteristic of ruminative responses are questioning the well-being of oneself and focusing on the possible causes and consequences of one's depressive symptoms (Nolen-Hoeksema, 1991). For example, some ruminative thoughts include "why am I such a loser", "I'm in such a bad mood" or "I just don't feel like doing anything".

There exist several types of rumination.
 State rumination, which involves dwelling on the consequences and feelings associated with the failure. State rumination is more common in people who are pessimistic, neurotic, and who have negative attributional styles.
 Action rumination, which consists of task-oriented thought processes focused on goal-achievement and correction of mistakes. 
 Task-irrelevant rumination, which utilizes events or people unassociated with the blocked goal to distract a person from the failure.
 Post-event processing is pervasive detailed reviewing of socially failed or embarrassing activities or situations that subjects perceive even more negatively/anxiety-provoking than they were, and they reinforce with pervasive recollections of similarly biased memories.
 Stress-reactive rumination is a pervasive detailed reviewing of painful experiences that specific stressful events induced and a cognitive bias enhances by memorising these events generally more stressful that they were while triggering depression.

Measurement 
There are multiple tools for measuring rumination. These include the following:

Ruminative responses scale 
The tendency to ruminate can be assessed with the Ruminative Responses Scale of the Response Styles Questionnaire. On this measure, people are asked to indicate how often they engage in 22 ruminative thoughts or behaviors when they feel sad or blue.

Rumination on sadness scale 
The Rumination On Sadness Scale is a self-report tool consisting of 13 items that uses the Likert Scale to measure rumination of sadness.

Repetitive thought/thinking questionnaire 
The 31-item Repetitive Thinking Questionnaire (RTQ) measures worry, rumination, and post-event processing with the purpose of controlling for effects associated with a psychological diagnosis or disorder. It includes two subscales, Repetitive Negative Thinking (RNT) and Absence of Repetitive Thinking (ART). RNT is associated with anxiety, depression, and other negative emotions as it influences metacognitive beliefs, cognitive avoidance strategies, and maladaptive thought control strategies. The ART subscale reflects the absence of those negative emotions associated with the RNT subscale, essentially measuring their opposites.

Rumination-reflection scale 
The Rumination-Reflection Scale involves 24 items. Half of the questions look for adaptive reflective thought while the other half note self-rumination focus. This scale incorporates the Likert Scale.

Sex differences 
According to Susan Nolen-Hoeksema, women tend to ruminate when they are depressed, whereas men tend to distract themselves. This difference in response style was proposed to explain the higher rates of depression in women compared to men. Research has supported the theory that women have a greater likelihood to ruminate than men, but the magnitude of this difference seems to be small. The prediction that men are more likely to distract themselves has not been consistently supported in research.

A meta-analysis was performed on both the sex differences in rumination of adults and the rumination subtypes "brooding" and "reflection." Studies show that women's chances of experiencing depressive symptoms or depression was twice that of men. The response styles theory (RST) suggests this may be due, to some extent, to higher rates of rumination in women. Brooding can be operationalized as continuous, passive, negative internalized thoughts. It is highly connected to worsening depression. Reflection is neutral, rather than negative, more active observation of self. In the meta-analysis, women showed statistically significant increases in levels of both brooding and reflection, supporting RST. Interestingly, there was a much smaller sex difference in reflection than brooding. The meta-analyses found similar results across multiple study designs.

Healthy self-disclosure 
Although rumination is generally unhealthy and associated with depression, thinking and talking about one's feelings can be beneficial under the right conditions. According to Pennebaker, healthy self-disclosure can reduce distress and rumination when it leads to greater insight and understanding about the source of one's problems. Thus, when people share their feelings with others in the context of supportive relationships, they are likely to experience growth. In contrast, when people repetitively ruminate and dwell on the same problem without making progress, they are likely to experience depression. Co-rumination is a process defined as "excessively discussing personal problems within a dyadic relationship", a construct that is relatively understudied in both its negative and positive trade-offs.

Treatment

Rumination-focused cognitive behavioral therapy 
Some studies have begun developing a type of cognitive behavioral therapy that focuses on rumination, but further research is still needed. Rumination-focused cognitive behavior therapy aims to teach patients to recognize when they begin to ruminate and ultimately re-frame the way they view themselves.

Relationship to other related constructs 
Rumination has been confounded with other similar constructs that may overlap with it. Worry and negative automatic thoughts are two of them.

Worry 
Rumination appears closely related to worry. Some models consider rumination to be a type of worry (S-REF). Worry has been identified as "a chain of thoughts and images, negatively affect-laden and relatively uncontrollable; it represents an attempt to engage in mental problem solving on an issue whose outcome is uncertain, but contains the possibility of one or more negative outcomes."

Worry is often studied in the context of generalized anxiety disorder (GAD), whereas rumination is often studied in the context of major depressive disorder. Because of the high comorbidity of these two conditions, more recent research is exploring the overlap of worry and rumination.

According to the Mental Health Foundation, rumination has been identified to be one of the main problems that leads to anxiety and depression. A study conducted by psychologists from the University of Liverpool, suggests that dwelling on negative events that have occurred in one's life is the biggest predictor of depression and anxiety.

Measures of rumination and worry have also demonstrated high correlations, above and beyond that of symptom measures of anxiety and depression (r=.66; Beck & Perkins, 2001). Rumination and worry overlap in their relationships to anxiety and depression, although some studies do indicate specificity of rumination to depression and worry to anxiety. Rumination has been found to predict changes in both depression and anxiety symptoms and individuals with major depression have been reported to engage in levels of worry similar to individuals with GAD. As a whole, these studies suggest that rumination and worry are related not only to each other, but also each is related to symptoms of both depression and anxiety.

Other studies have demonstrated that the content of worry and rumination are distinct; worry thoughts are often focused on problem-solving and have a future orientation, whereas ruminative thoughts concern themes of loss and are more focused on the past. Rumination, as compared to worry, has also been associated with less effort and less confidence in problem solving (Papageorgiou & Wells, 2004). It has also been suggested that rumination and worry serve different purposes, namely that rumination is associated with greater belief in the personal relevance of a situation and a larger need to understand it, whereas worry is associated with a desire to avoid worry thoughts (Watkins 2004b). Worry has also been hypothesized to contain more imagery than rumination; however, support for this has been mixed.

Overall, these studies suggest that worry and rumination are related constructs that both lead to depression and anxiety. It is likely that rumination and worry, as with rumination and reflection, are related types of repetitive negative thinking that may be better captured as subtypes of some larger construct, such as avoidant coping strategies.

Automatic negative thoughts 
Rumination has been compared to automatic negative thoughts, defined as repetitive thoughts that contain themes of personal loss or failure.
Nolen-Hoeksema (2004) contends that rumination (as defined in RST) is distinct from negative automatic thoughts in that while negative automatic thoughts are relatively shorthand appraisals of loss and depression in depression, rumination consists of longer chains of repetitive, recyclic, negative and self-focused thinking that may occur as a response to initial negative thoughts. Nolen also suggests that rumination may, in addition to analysis of symptoms, causes, and consequences, contain negative themes like those in automatic thoughts. Similarly, Papageorgiou and Wells (2004) have provided supports to this conclusion when they found that rumination can predict depression even when negative cognitions are controlled, suggesting that these constructs do not wholly overlap and have different predictive value.
Despite Nolen-Hoeksema's (2004) argument that rumination and negative automatic thoughts are distinct phenomena, the Response Style Questionnaire has been criticized for its conceptual overlap with negative automatic thoughts.

See also 
 Obsessive–compulsive disorder
 Ovsiankina effect
 Perseverative cognition

References

Further reading 

 
 
 
 
 

Anxiety
Depression (mood)